Enrique Ernesto Corti (born 21 March 1963) is a former Argentine football midfielder and recently managed for Cobán Imperial.

After retiring as a player, he coached teams in Argentina, Mexico and El Salvador.

References

External links
 http://www.bdfa.com.ar/jugadores-ENRIQUE-ERNESTO-CORTI-1106.html
 http://www.zerozero.pt/player.php?id=268631;

1963 births
Living people
Argentine footballers
Argentine football managers
Expatriate football managers in El Salvador
Association football midfielders